Horace Twiss KC (28 February 1787 – 4 May 1849) was an English writer and politician.

Life
Twiss was born at Bath, Somerset, the son of Francis Twiss (1760–1827) and his wife Frances née Kemble (sister of Sarah Siddons née Kemble). He was a Shakespearian scholar. In his youth he wrote light articles for newspapers; he became a successful lawyer and was appointed a Queen's Counsel in 1827. In 1820 he was elected to Parliament, where, with some interruptions, he sat until 1841, holding the office of Under-Secretary of State for War and the Colonies in 1828–1830. In 1844 he was appointed vice-chancellor of the Duchy of Lancaster, a well-paid post which enabled him to enjoy his popularity in London society. For some years he wrote for The Times, in which he first compiled the parliamentary summary, and his daughter married first Francis Bacon (d. 1840) and then J. T. Delane, both of them editors of that paper. He was the author of The Public and Private Life of Lord Chancellor Eldon, and other volumes. He died suddenly in London on 4 May 1849, aged 62. He was survived by his son, Quintin Twiss.

Notes

References

External links 
 

1787 births
1849 deaths
English male journalists
Members of the Parliament of the United Kingdom for English constituencies
People from Bath, Somerset
UK MPs 1820–1826
UK MPs 1826–1830
UK MPs 1830–1831
UK MPs 1831–1832
UK MPs 1832–1835
UK MPs 1835–1837